Rowfoot is a hamlet in Northumberland, England at .

External links

Hamlets in Northumberland